The Lotarev DV-2 (or PSLM DV-2, DV: Dnepr-Váh) is a two-spool turbofan engine manufactured in Považská Bystrica, Slovakia by Považské Strojárne Letecké Motory (PS Aircraft Engines/Motors) (PSLM) (former ZVL Závody na Výrobu Ložísk "Bearings Production/Manufacturing Plant") and designed in partnership with Ivchenko Lotarev Design Bureau.

Design and development
Developed from the Ivchenko AI-25 turbofan engine,  ZVL was also responsible for pre-production and serial engine production.

The DV-2 is a two-spool modular aviation turbofan engine with a single-stage overhung fan, two-stage LP compressor, seven-stage HP compressor, single-stage HP turbine, and two-stage LP turbine, and an annular combustion system.

One of the most unusual features of this military engine is the single stage fan; most trainer and combat engines have multi-staged fans, single stage fans normally  being the preserve of civil and military transport turbofans. Ivchenko Lotarev chose a very low specific thrust (net thrust/airflow) cycle for the DV-2, so a single stage fan is sufficient to develop the desired fan pressure ratio. Even so, the pressure ratio produced is somewhat higher than that normally developed by a single stage fan. Owing to the low specific thrust, the bypass ratio for the engine is higher than normal for a military turbofan.

This engine was required to power new versions of the L-39 trainer, L-39MS and L-59. Other turbofan engine models in the DV-2 family include the DV-2A, DV‑2A.2 and DV-2S.

The DV-2S was renamed "RD-35" by the Klimov under license agreement with the PSLM in 1993.

Applications
L-59 Super Albatros (L-39MS Albatros)
Hongdu L-15
Ilyushin Il-108

Specifications (DV-2S)

See also

References

External links

 PSLM company website

Ivchenko-Progress aircraft engines
Medium-bypass turbofan engines
Czechoslovakia–Soviet Union relations
1980s turbofan engines